Rosa Madeleine Florián Cedrón (born Cajamarca, 1969) is a Peruvian politician. She is a Congresswoman representing Cajamarca for the period 2006–2011, and belongs to the National Unity party. She was born May 18, 1969, and was Mayor of Contumaza.

References

Living people
1969 births
Peruvian women lawyers
People from Cajamarca Region
National Unity (Peru) politicians
Mayors of Cajamarca
Members of the Congress of the Republic of Peru
Women mayors of places in Peru
20th-century Peruvian lawyers
Women members of the Congress of the Republic of Peru